is a Japanese manga series by Hashigo Sakurabi. It is serialized in the  monthly magazine Magazine Be × Boy since July 2013 and has been collected in eight tankōbon volumes. An anime television series adaptation by CloverWorks aired from October to December 2018.  An anime film adaptation of the manga's Spain Arc premiered in October 2021.

Plot
Takato Saijō, an actor since childhood, has been recognized as the "sexiest man of the year" in the entertainment industry for five consecutive years. However, his first-place position has been usurped by Junta Azumaya, a young newcomer actor. While Takato firstly sees Junta as a rival, on the other hand, Junta admires Takato greatly and is in love with him.

Characters

Media

Manga 
Dakaichi: I'm Being Harassed By the Sexiest Man of the Year began serialization in Libre Publishing's  monthly magazine Magazine Be × Boy since July 2013 and has been collected in eight tankōbon volumes as of September 2021. Digital manga publisher Futekiya announced in August 2021 that they had licensed the series for a digital release.

Volume list

Anime 
An anime television series adaptation, DakaIchi: I'm Being Harassed By the Sexiest Man of the Year, aired from October 5 to December 28, 2018 on Tokyo MX. The series is animated by CloverWorks and directed by Naoyuki Tatsuwa, with Yoshimi Narita handling series composition, Minako Shiba designing the characters, Masaru Yokoyama composing the series' music, and Satoshi Motoyama as sound director. Minako Shiba is the chief animation director alongside Senri Kawaguchi and Yu Kurihara. The opening theme is "Fukanzen Monologue" by Tomohisa Sako.  The ending theme is  "Chuntaka!" by Yūki Ono and Hiroki Takahashi under their character names. Aniplex of America has licensed the series and streamed it on Crunchyroll. The series ran for 13 episodes.

Episode list

Film
On April 19, 2021, it was announced that the series would be receiving an anime film adaptation which premiered on October 9, 2021.  The film is centered around the manga's Spain Arc.  The main staff and cast members are returning to reprise their roles.

Notes

Reception

By January 2020, the manga series sold a cumulative total of 3 million physical copies.

References

External links
 

Anime series based on manga
Aniplex
CloverWorks
Japanese LGBT-related animated television series
Yaoi anime and manga
2010s Japanese LGBT-related television series
2021 anime films